Elizabeth Moody (1737 Kingston upon Thames - 1814) was a British poet, and literary critic.

Life
Elizabeth Greenly was the daughter of a wealthy lawyer, who died when she was 13, but left a legacy for her family. 
A book-lover from an early age, she was well read in English, French, and Italian literature. 
For many years she privately circulated verse in a circle that included Edward Lovibond and George Hardinge.  
She remained unmarried until the age of 40 when, in 1777, she wed the dissenting clergyman Christopher Lake Moody (1753–1915), vicar of Turnham Green.

Literary Accomplishments
Moody reviewed books for Monthly Review, a job she likely came to through her husband, as Christopher reviewed for them as well. The Moody's were dissenting Presbyterians, as was the Monthly Review'''s editor, Ralph Griffiths, and this is how they came to know him both personally and professionally.  She also reviewed books for the weekly newspaper, The St. James's Chronicle in which her husband owned a share. She and her husband also contributed poetry to the weekly St. James's Chronicle.

Works
 Poetical Trifles'', 1798, printed by H. Baldwin and Son; for T. Cadell, Jun. and W. Davies, 1798

Anthologies

References

External links
"Elizabeth Moody", Literary Encyclopedia

British poets
British women poets
People from Kingston upon Thames
1737 births
1814 deaths
British literary critics
British women literary critics